Yakima Electric Railway Museum is located at the corner of South Third Avenue and Pine Street in Yakima, Washington.

The museum is operated by Yakima Valley Trolleys, a non-profit organization. Vintage trolleys operate on a seasonal schedule on some of the original tracks of the Yakima Valley Transportation Company. The fleet consists of two identical cars built in 1928–1929 by Oporto's streetcar company  on Brill designs — whimsically renumbered №1776 (former STCP 260) and №1976 (former STCP 254). as well as rolling stock from the Yakima Valley Transportation Company.

Entrance to the museum is free, but there is a fare for the trolley ride.

References

External links

 Yakima Valley Trolleys

Railroad museums in Washington (state)
Heritage railroads in Washington (state)
Streetcars in Washington (state)
Heritage streetcar systems
Buildings and structures in Yakima, Washington
Electric railways in Washington (state)
Museums in Yakima County, Washington
Street railway museums in the United States